The Martinez Unified School District (MUSD) is a public school district in Contra Costa County, California. It currently serves over 4,000 students and operates 4 elementary schools, one middle school and one high school, with two alternative schools as well as an adult education program.

The district includes the majority of Martinez and the following locations: Alhambra Valley, Mountain View, the majority of Vine Hill, and portions of Reliez Valley.

Elementary schools
John Muir
John Swett
Las Juntas
Morello Park

Middle schools
Martinez Junior High

High schools
 Alhambra High - Official Website

Alternative Schools
Vicente Martinez Alternative High School
Briones School

References

External links
 Martinez Unified School District Official Website

 
Martinez, California
School districts in Contra Costa County, California